David Castle may refer to:

David S. Castle (1884–1956), architect in Texas
David Castle (musician) (born 1952), American singer, musician and songwriter.
David Castle (philosopher) (born 1967), Canadian philosopher and bioethicist
David Castle (cricketer) (born 1972), former cricketer